An extravaganza is a type of literary and musical work. It may also refer to:

Extravaganza may also refer to:

 Extravaganza (TV series), an Indonesian comedy and variety show
 Extravaganza (album), by British rock group Stackridge
 "Extravaganza" (song), by R&B singer Jamie Foxx
 Extravaganza (music festival), an event held annually at the University of California, Santa Barbara